Hacon of Sweden - English also often: Haakon ; Swedish: Håkan - may refer to:

Haki, mythological ruler
Håkan the Red, King of Sweden 11th century
Haakon VI of Norway, King of Sweden 1362